Killin Music Fest is a Scottish music festival held annually in Killin, Perthshire.

Killin Music Fest

The festival was launched in late 2015 by a local voluntary team who started planning for their first event in the summer of 2016.

In June 2016, the weekend festival was attended by nearly 1,000 people and hosted over 100 artists across Friday 17, Saturday 18 and Sunday 19 June 2016. The festival incorporates one main stage in the McLaren Hall, Killin, along with workshops, sessions and fringe activities throughout the area.

In November 2016 the festival was nominated as the Best New Festival at the UK Festival Awards 2016.

In June 2017, the festival expanded to include a session tent marquee.

In November 2017, the festival was nominated for Event of the Year in the MG Alba Scots Trad Music Awards 2017, one of five finalists.

In February 2018, the festival was nominated for an Epic Award from Voluntary Arts, one of ten Scottish finalists.

In June 2018, the festival session tent marquee evolved into a second stage.

In July 2019, the organising group became a Scottish Charitable Incorporated Organisation.

In January 2020, the event was rebranded using the shorter name 'Killin Music Fest'.

In March 2020, due to the outbreak of COVID-19 the fifth festival, which was scheduled to take place from 19 to 21 June 2020, was postponed and rescheduled to take place from 18 to 20 June 2021.

In December 2021 the Manran concert scheduled for 30 December was cancelled due to the ongoing COVID-19 restrictions.

In May 2022 the festival announced the renaming of the marquee stage to the Danny Kyle Stage.

2016
The first Killin Music Festival was held from 17 to 19 June 2016. The main stage ran from 18:00 until 01:00 on Friday 17 June, and from 15:30 until 01:00 on Saturday 18 June. The lineup on Sunday 19 June focused on an open stage competition, running from 12:00 until 17:30. Various ancillary events ran across the weekend, including singing and music workshops, gigs in local pubs and bars, and local heritage tours. The event ran in the McLaren Hall, Killin. The festival office was located in an empty shop on the main street of the village. The event was compered by Liz Clark of Celtic Music Radio, who helped organise the Killin Traditional Music and Dance Festival in the mid 1990s.

Artists

Notes
1. The Claire Hastings Band was originally scheduled to perform on the Saturday line-up, but were replaced by Jenn Butterworth & LB Salter when Claire was unable to perform due to laryngitis.

2017
The second Killin Music Festival was held from 16 to 19 June 2017 in Killin, Perthshire. The main stage ran from 18:30 until 01:30 on Friday 16 June, and from 18:00 until 01:30 on Saturday 17 June. The main stage extended in 2017 to include a seated concert on Sunday 19 June, running from 19:00 until 23:00. During the morning of Sunday 19th, a Community Stage event was introduced, focusing on local performers and talent. The open stage competition was relocated to the Killin Hotel. Various other ancillary events ran across the weekend, including singing and music workshops, workouts, pipe band parades, and local heritage talks. The event ran in the McLaren Hall, Killin. The festival office was relocated to the local sports pavilion, and a session tent was introduced located in the pavilion grounds. The event was compered by Liz Clark.

Artists

2018
The third Killin Music Festival was held from 15 to 17 June 2018 in Killin, Perthshire. Early bird tickets went on sale on Monday 19 June 2017 and sold out within 90 minutes. The event was compered by Liz Clark.

Artists

2019
The fourth Killin Music Festival was held from 14 to 16 June 2019 in Killin, Perthshire. The event was compered by Paddy Callaghan.

Artists

2020–21
Killin Music Fest was scheduled to take place from 19 to 21 June 2020 in Killin, Perthshire. Due to the outbreak of COVID-19 the event was postponed and rescheduled to take place from 18 to 20 June 2021. Due to ongoing COVID-19 restrictions the event was again postponed in 2021 and rescheduled to take place from 17 to 29 June 2022.

2022
The fifth Killin Music Fest took place from 17 to 19 June 2022 in Killin, Perthshire. The event was compered by Paddy Callaghan.

Artists

2023
The sixth Killin Music Fest is scheduled to take place from 16 to 18 June 2023 in Killin, Perthshire.

Open Stage Competition
From 2016 to 2019 the festival ran an open stage competition during the weekend where five artists or groups are selected from applicants, with one winner being judged by an industry expert. The winner was presented with an Open Stage Winner trophy and is invited to play on the main stage at the following years festival.

Col Charles Stewart Quaich 

In 2022 the festival introduced a competition to award the new Col Charles Stewart Quaich. The competition accepts any performance of music, poetry or stories, which celebrate the local area of Killin and Perthshire, and is inspired by Killin's heritage in traditional Scottish music, in particular, Stewart's ‘The Killin Collection’.

Col Charles Stewart (1823-1894) was a prominent figure in Killin and Perthshire, and helped to preserve and promote local history, folklore and music. Among his many achievements Stewart was Chief of the Perth Gaelic Society, Director of the Killin Railway, head of Killin Gaelic Choir and was a respected historian and translator of old manuscripts. Born in Glen Lyon, Stewart spent the greater part of his life in Killin at Tigh’n Duin (the now demolished youth hostel). His legacy ‘The Killin Collection’ comprises songs and tunes of the local area from the 18th century.

Other events 
The group have also organised other events alongside the summer festival weekend.

History

Killin Traditional Music and Dance Festival 1995 – 2003 
The Killin Traditional Music and Dance Festival, also known as Killin Folk Festival, ran for nine festivals from 1995 until 2003. Danny Kyle served as festival director for the first three festivals, from 1995 through 1998, until his passing on 7 July 1998.

References

Music festivals established in 1995
Music festivals in Scotland
1995 establishments in Scotland
Stirling (council area)
Folk festivals in the United Kingdom
Music in Stirling (council area)